Metodontia is a genus of land snails, terrestrial gastropod mollusks in the family Bradybaenidae. This genus is considered to be the most primitive of the bradybaenid snails.

Species list
Species within the genus Metodontia include:
Metodontia beresowskii (Mollendorff, 1899)
Metodontia griphodes (Sturany, 1901)
Metodontia huaiensis huaiensis (Crosse, 1882)
Metodontia huaiensis (Mollendorff, 1886)
Metodontia yantaiensis yantaiensis (Crosse & Debeaux, 1863) 
Metodontia yantaiensis tetrodon (Mollendorff, 1875)

Habitat
These are terrestrial snails.

References

Bradybaenidae